MacLehose Medical Rehabilitation Centre is a rehab and long-term care hospital above Sandy Bay in Hong Kong. Founded in 1984 by the Hong Kong Society for Rehabilitation, it has 150 medical rehabilitation beds, including 20 beds for day rehabilitation service. It is affiliated with the Li Ka Shing Faculty of Medicine, the University of Hong Kong, providing clinical attachment opportunities for its medical students.

History
The centre was officially opened on 7 December 1984, named after Murray MacLehose, the former Governor of Hong Kong.

References

External links

Hospital buildings completed in 1984
Hospitals in Hong Kong
Hospitals established in 1984
Sandy Bay, Hong Kong
1984 establishments in Hong Kong